The 2021 Cedar Rapids mayoral election was held of November 2, 2021, with a subsequent runoff election held on November 30, 2021. The first round of the election futured three major candidates. Candidate Tiffany O'Donnell strongly led the first round, with candidate Amara Andrews finishing in second place. Incumbent mayor Brad Hart failed to advance to the runoff, narrowly finishing behind Andrews. In the runoff election, O'Donnell handily won the election, winning more than twice as many votes as Andrews.

Although Cedar Rapids municipal elections are officially nonpartisan on the ballot, candidates could still state their political affiliation on filings or self-identify with a party.

Candidates

Tiffany O'Donnell, leader of Iowa Women Lead Change, former news anchor (stated as Republican)
Amara Andrews, leader of Advocates for Social Justice (stated as Democrat)
Brad Hart, incumbent mayor of Cedar Rapids (2018–present) (stated as Non-affiliated/other)
Myra Colby Bradwell (stated as The Peoples Party)

References

2021
Cedar Rapids, Iowa